This is a list of adoption dates of the Gregorian calendar by country. For explanation, see the article about the Gregorian calendar.

Except where stated otherwise, the transition was a move by the civil authorities from the Julian to the Gregorian calendar. In religious sources it could be that the Julian calendar was used for a longer period of time, in particular by Protestant and Eastern Orthodox churches. The historic area does not necessarily match the present-day area or country. The column 'Present country' only provides a logic search entry. With a few exceptions, the former colonies of European powers are not shown separately.

There are only four countries which have not adopted the Gregorian calendar: Ethiopia (Ethiopian calendar), Nepal (Vikram Samvat and Nepal Sambat), Iran and Afghanistan (Solar Hijri calendar).

List
Legend

See also 
 cal (command)
 Adoption of the Gregorian calendar
 Old Style and New Style dates

References

Gregorian calendar
Gregorian calendar